In interface design, a tab is a graphical user interface object that allows multiple documents or panels to be contained within a single window, using tabs as a navigational widget for switching between sets of documents. It is an interface style most commonly associated with web browsers, web applications, text editors, and preference panes, with window managers, especially tiling window managers, being lesser known examples.

Tabs are modeled after traditional card tabs inserted in paper files or card indexes (in keeping with the desktop metaphor).

Tabs may appear in a horizontal bar or as a vertical list, of which the former takes typically less screen space whereas the latter can show more items at once while still having space for individual titles. Horizontal tabs may have multiple rows. Tabs may be organizable by changing their order through drag and drop or creating a separate window from an existing tab. Implementations may support range-selecting multiple tabs for moving, closing, and separating them.

History
The WordVision DOS word processor for the IBM PC in 1982 was perhaps the first commercially available product with a tabbed interface. PC Magazine later wrote that it "has served as a free R&D department for the software business—its bones picked over for a decade by programmers looking for so-called new ideas".

Don Hopkins developed and released several versions of tabbed window frames for the NeWS window system as free software, which the window manager applied to all NeWS applications, and enabled users to drag the tabs around to any edge of the window.

The NeWS version of UniPress's Gosling Emacs text editor was another early product with multiple tabbed windows in 1988. It was used to develop an authoring tool for Ben Shneiderman's hypermedia browser HyperTIES (the NeWS workstation version of The Interactive Encyclopedia System), in 1988 at the University of Maryland Human-Computer Interaction Lab. HyperTIES also supported pie menus for managing windows and browsing hypermedia documents with PostScript applets.

While Boeing Calc already utilized tabbed sheets (as so called wordpads) since at least 1987, Borland's Quattro Pro popularized tabs for spreadsheets in 1992. Microsoft Word in 1993 used them to simplify submenus. In 1994, BookLink Technologies featured tabbed windows in its InternetWorks browser. That same year, the text editor UltraEdit also appeared with a modern multi-row tabbed interface.  The tabbed interface approach was then followed by the Internet Explorer shell NetCaptor in 1997. These were followed by a number of others like IBrowse in 1999, and Opera in 2000 (with the release of version 4 - although a MDI interface was supported before then), MultiViews October 2000, which changed its name into MultiZilla on 1 April 2001 (an extension for the Mozilla Application Suite), Galeon in early 2001, Mozilla 0.9.5 in October 2001, Phoenix 0.1 (now Mozilla Firefox) in October 2002, Konqueror 3.1 in January 2003, and Safari in 2003. With the release of Internet Explorer 7 in 2006, all major web browsers featured a tabbed interface.

Users have quickly adopted the use of tabs in web browsing and web search. A study of tabbed browsing behavior in June 2009 found that users switched tabs in 57% of tab sessions, and 36% of users used new tabs to open search engine results at least once during that period.

Numerous special functions in association with browser tabs have emerged since then. One example is visual tabbed browsing in OmniWeb version 5, which displays preview images of pages in a drawer to the left or right of the main browser window. Another feature is the ability to re-order tabs and to bookmark all of the webpages opened in tab panes in a given window in a group or bookmark folder (as well as the ability to reopen all of them at the same time). Microsoft Internet Explorer marks tab families with different colours.

Development
Tab behavior is handled by the  widget toolkit it is built with (for example Firefox uses GTK). Behavior such as whether a tab opens at the end of the list, next to its parent or at the beginning of a list is determined by the graphical user interface (GUI) toolkit framework. Due to the large diversity of available widget tool kits, tabs may appear to behave unexpectedly to users inexperienced in front end design.

In 2021, researchers published the first in-depth study of Web browser tab interfaces in over a decade. They found that many people struggle with tab overload and conducted surveys and interviews about people's tab use. Thereby they formalized pressures for closing tabs and for keeping tabs open. The authors then developed related UI design considerations which could enable better tools and changes to the code of Web browsers – like Firefox – that allow knowledge workers and other users to better manage – and make use of – their browser tabs.

See also
 Comparison of document interfaces 
 Microsoft Internet Explorer marks tab families with different colours
 IDE-style interface
 Ribbon (computing)

References

External links

 TabPanel Widget
 ASP.NET AJAX Control Toolkit
 Scriptaculous AJAX tabs
 Tab Window Demo deDevelopmentmo of the Pie Menu Tab Window Manager for The NeWS Toolkit 2.0 (1991).

Graphical user interface elements
Document interface
Graphical control elements